ANT is a proprietary (but open access) multicast wireless sensor network technology designed and marketed by ANT Wireless (a division of Garmin Canada). It provides personal area networks (PANs), primarily for activity trackers. ANT was introduced by Dynastream Innovations in 2003, followed by the low-power standard ANT+ in 2004, before Dynastream was bought by Garmin in 2006. 

ANT defines a wireless communications protocol stack that enables hardware operating in the 2.4 GHz ISM band to communicate by establishing standard rules for co-existence, data representation, signalling, authentication, and error detection. It is conceptually similar to Bluetooth low energy, but is oriented towards use with sensors.

 the ANT website lists almost 200 brands using ANT technology. Samsung and, to a lesser part, Fujitsu, HTC, Kyocera, Nokia and Sharp added native support (without the use of a USB adapter) to their smartphones, with Samsung starting support with the Galaxy S4 and ending support with the Galaxy S20 line.

Overview
ANT-powered nodes are capable of acting as sources or sinks within a wireless sensor network concurrently. This means the nodes can act as transmitters, receivers, or transceivers to route traffic to other nodes. In addition, every node is capable of determining when to transmit based on the activity of its neighbors.

Technical information
ANT can be configured to spend long periods in a low-power sleep mode (consuming of the order of microamps of current), wake up briefly to communicate (when consumption rises to a peak of 22mA (at -5dB) during reception and 13.5mA (at -5 dB) during transmission) and return to sleep mode. Average current consumption for low message rates is less than 60 microamps on some devices.

Each ANT channel consists of one or more transmitting nodes and one or more receiving nodes, depending on the network topology. Any node can transmit or receive, so the channels are bi-directional.

ANT accommodates three types of messaging: broadcast, acknowledged, and burst. Broadcast is a one-way communication from one node to another (or many). The receiving node(s) transmit no acknowledgment, but the receiving node may still send messages back to the transmitting node. This technique is suited to sensor applications and is the most economical method of operation.

Acknowledged messaging confirms receipt of data packets. The transmitter is informed of success or failure, although there are no retransmissions. This technique is suited to control applications.

ANT can also be used for burst messaging; this is a multi-message transmission technique using the full data bandwidth and running to completion. The receiving node acknowledges receipt and informs of corrupted packets that the transmitter then re-sends. The packets are sequence numbered for traceability. This technique is suited to data block transfer where the integrity of the data is paramount.

Comparison to other protocols
ANT was designed for low bit-rate and low power sensor networks, in a manner conceptually similar to (but not compatible with) Bluetooth low energy. This is in contrast with normal Bluetooth, which was designed for relatively high bit-rate applications such as streaming sound for low power headsets.

ANT uses adaptive isochronous transmission to allow many ANT devices to communicate concurrently without interference from one another, unlike Bluetooth LE, which supports an unlimited number of nodes through scatternets and broadcasting between devices.

Interference immunity
Bluetooth, Wi-Fi, and Zigbee employ Direct Sequence Spread Spectrum (DSSS) and Frequency-Hopping Spread Spectrum (FHSS) schemes respectively to maintain the integrity of the wireless link.

ANT uses an adaptive isochronous network technology to ensure coexistence with other ANT devices. This scheme provides the ability for each transmission to occur in an interference free time slot within the defined frequency band. The radio transmits for less than 150 µs per message, allowing a single channel to be divided into hundreds of time slots. The ANT messaging period (the time between each node transmitting its data) determines how many time slots are available.

ANT+
ANT+, introduced in 2004 as "the first ultra low power wireless standard", is an interoperability function that can be added to the base ANT protocol. This standardization allows for the networking of nearby ANT+ devices to facilitate the open collection and interpretation of sensor data. For example, ANT+ enabled fitness monitoring devices such as heart rate monitors, pedometers, speed monitors, and weight scales can all work together to assemble and track performance metrics.

ANT+ is designed and maintained by the ANT+ Alliance which is managed by ANT Wireless, a division of Dynastream Innovations owned by Garmin. ANT+ is used in Garmin's line of fitness monitoring equipment. It is also used by Garmin's Chirp, a geocaching device, for logging and alerting nearby participants.

ANT+ devices require certification from the ANT+ Alliance to ensure compliance with standard device profiles. Each device profile has an icon which may be used to visually match interoperable devices sharing the same device profiles.

The ANT+ specification is publicly available. At DEF CON 2019, hacker Brad Dixon demonstrated a tool to modify ANT+ data transmitted through USB for cheating in virtual cycling.

See also 
 LoRa
 Wi-Fi
 Wireless USB

References

External links
 
 Open-source communication tool (antpm)

Wireless sensor network